Mathieu da Vinha (born 15 March 1976) is a 21st-century French historian. He is the author of several studies or biographies relating to life under the reign of king Louis XIV. A research associate, he is the scientific director of the Palace of Versailles Research Centre.

Career 
Mathieu da Vinha was born in Argenteuil. After studying in Paris in Khâgne at the lycée Paul-Valéry then , Mathieu da Vinha studied history at the Paris-Sorbonne University, where he obtained a doctorate in modern history in 2003. In 2006, he joined the corps of engineers of ancient sources, and the following year that of research engineers in source analysis.

He is currently the Scientific Director of the Palace of Versailles Research Centre.

Mathieu da Vinha is the historical advisor to the television series Versailles, 23 November 2015 broadcast on Canal+ from November 2015.

Works

Publications 
 Les Valets de chambre de Louis XIV, series Pour l'Histoire, Paris, June 2004, 
 Louis XIV et Versailles, éd. Arts Lys/Château de Versailles, Versailles, 2009
 Le Versailles de Louis XIV : Le fonctionnement d'une résidence royale au XVIIe,Perrin, series Pour l'Histoire, Paris, September 2009 ; reissued Le Grand Livre du mois and France Loisirs, 2010
 Alexandre Bontemps, Premier valet de chambre de Louis XIV, Perrin, series Les métiers de Versailles, Paris, October 2011
 Au service du roi. Dans les coulisses de Versailles, 2015.

Copublication 
 Versailles pour les Nuls (with Raphaël Masson), First & Château de Versailles, March 2011.

Codirection of works 
2010: Les Grandes galeries européennes, XVIIe/XIXe (with Claire Constans), Centre de recherche du château de Versailles/Éditions de la Maison des sciences de l'homme, series "Aulica"
2011: Cultures de cour, cultures du corps, XIVe/XVIIIe (with Catherine Lanoë and Bruno Laurioux), series "Mythes, Critique et Histoire"
2014: Louis XIV, l'image et le mythe (with Alexandre Maral and Nicolas Milovanovic), editions Presses universitaires de Rennes & Centre de recherche du château de Versailles, series Histoire, Aulica. L'univers de la cour
2015 Versailles : histoire, dictionnaire et anthologie(with Raphaël Masson), éditions Robert Laffont, series Bouquins

References

External links 
 Mathieu da Vinha on Université de Versailles
 Mathieu da Vinha on Babelio
 Mathieu da Vinha on Science patrimoine
 Mathieu Da Vinha on France Loisirs
 Mathieu Da Vinha on academia.edu
 Mathieu Da Vinha on France Culture

1976 births
People from Argenteuil
Living people
Paris-Sorbonne University alumni
21st-century French historians